A sleep disorder, or somnipathy, is a medical disorder of an individual's sleep patterns. Some sleep disorders are severe enough to interfere with normal physical, mental, social and emotional functioning. Polysomnography and actigraphy are tests commonly ordered for diagnosing sleep disorders.

Sleep disorders are broadly classified into dyssomnias, parasomnias, circadian rhythm sleep disorders involving the timing of sleep, and other disorders including ones caused by medical or psychological conditions. When a person struggles to fall asleep and/or stay asleep with no obvious cause, it is referred to as insomnia, the most common sleep disorder. Others include sleep apnea, narcolepsy and hypersomnia (excessive sleepiness at inappropriate times), sleeping sickness (disruption of sleep cycle due to infection), sleepwalking, and night terrors.

Sleep disruptions can be caused by various issues, including teeth grinding (bruxism) and night terrors. Management of sleep disturbances that are secondary to mental, medical or substance abuse disorders should focus on the underlying conditions.

Primary sleep disorders are common in both children and adults. However, there is a significant lack of awareness in children with sleep disorders, due to most cases being unidentified. Several common factors involved in the onset of a sleep disorder include increased medication use, age-related changes in circadian rhythms, environmental changes, lifestyle changes, pre-diagnosed physiological problems, or stress. Among the elderly, the risk of developing sleep disordered breathing, periodic limb movements, restless legs syndrome, REM sleep behavior disorders, insomnia, and circadian rhythm disturbances is especially increased.

List of conditions
There are a number of sleep disorders. The following list includes some of them:
 Bruxism, involuntary grinding or clenching of the teeth while sleeping
 Catathrenia, nocturnal groaning during prolonged exhalation
 Delayed sleep phase disorder (DSPD), inability to awaken and fall asleep at socially acceptable times but no problem with sleep maintenance, a disorder of circadian rhythms. Other such disorders are advanced sleep phase disorder (ASPD), non-24-hour sleep–wake disorder (non-24) in the sighted or in the blind, and irregular sleep wake rhythm, all much less common than DSPD, as well as the situational shift work sleep disorder.
 Fatal familial insomnia, an extremely rare  and universally-fatal prion disease that causes a complete cessation of sleep.
 Hypopnea syndrome, abnormally shallow breathing or slow respiratory rate while sleeping
 Idiopathic hypersomnia, a primary, neurologic cause of long-sleeping, sharing many similarities with narcolepsy
 Insomnia disorder (primary insomnia), chronic difficulty in falling asleep and/or maintaining sleep when no other cause is found for these symptoms. Insomnia can also be comorbid with or secondary to other disorders.
 Kleine–Levin syndrome, a rare disorder characterized by persistent episodic hypersomnia and cognitive or mood changes
 Narcolepsy, characterized by excessive daytime sleepiness (EDS) and so-called "sleep attacks," relatively sudden-onset, irresistible urges to sleep, which may interfere with occupational and social commitments. About 70% of those who have narcolepsy also have cataplexy, a sudden weakness in the motor muscles that can result in collapse to the floor while retaining full conscious awareness.
 Night terror, Pavor nocturnus, sleep terror disorder, an abrupt awakening from sleep with behavior consistent with terror
 Nocturia, a frequent need to get up and urinate at night. It differs from enuresis, or bed-wetting, in which the person does not arouse from sleep, but the bladder nevertheless empties.
 Parasomnias, disruptive sleep-related events involving inappropriate actions during sleep, for example sleepwalking, night-terrors and catathrenia.
 Periodic limb movements in sleep (PLMS), sudden involuntary movement of the arms and/or legs during sleep. In the absence of other sleep disorders, PLMS may cause sleep disruption and impair sleep quality, leading to periodic limb movement disorder (PLMD).
 Other limb movements in sleep, including hypneic jerks and nocturnal myoclonus.
 Rapid eye movement sleep behavior disorder (RBD), acting out violent or dramatic dreams while in REM sleep, sometimes injuring bed partner or self (REM sleep disorder or RSD)
 Restless legs syndrome (RLS), an irresistible urge to move legs.
 Shift work sleep disorder (SWSD), a situational circadian rhythm sleep disorder. (Jet lag was previously included as a situational circadian rhythm sleep disorder, but it does not appear in DSM-5, see Diagnostic and Statistical Manual of Mental Disorders for more).
 Sleep apnea, obstructive sleep apnea, obstruction of the airway during sleep, causing lack of sufficient deep sleep, often accompanied by snoring. Other forms of sleep apnea are less common. Obstructive sleep apnea (OSA) is a medical disorder that is caused by repetitive collapse of the upper airway (back of the throat) during sleep. For the purposes of sleep studies, episodes of full upper airway collapse for at least ten seconds are called apneas.
 Sleep paralysis, characterized by temporary paralysis of the body shortly before or after sleep. Sleep paralysis may be accompanied by visual, auditory or tactile hallucinations. It is not a disorder unless severe, and is often seen as part of narcolepsy.
 Sleepwalking or somnambulism, engaging in activities normally associated with wakefulness (such as eating or dressing), which may include walking, without the conscious knowledge of the subject.
 Somniphobia, one cause of sleep deprivation, a dread/ fear of falling asleep or going to bed. Signs of the illness include anxiety and panic attacks before and during attempts to sleep.

Types 
 Dyssomnias – A broad category of sleep disorders characterized by either hypersomnia or insomnia. The three major subcategories include intrinsic (i.e., arising from within the body), extrinsic (secondary to environmental conditions or various pathologic conditions), and disturbances of circadian rhythm.
 Insomnia: Insomnia may be primary or it may be comorbid with or secondary to another disorder such as a mood disorder (i.e., emotional stress, anxiety, depression) or underlying health condition (i.e., asthma, diabetes, heart disease, pregnancy or neurological conditions).
 Primary hypersomnia: Hypersomnia of central or brain origin
 Narcolepsy: A chronic neurological disorder (or dyssomnia), which is caused by the brain's inability to control sleep and wakefulness.
 Idiopathic hypersomnia: A chronic neurological disease similar to narcolepsy, in which there is an increased amount of fatigue and sleep during the day. Patients who have idiopathic hypersomnia cannot obtain a healthy amount of sleep for a regular day of activities. This hinders the patients' ability to perform well, and patients have to deal with this for the rest of their lives.
 Recurrent hypersomnia, including Kleine–Levin syndrome
 Post traumatic hypersomnia
 Menstrual-related hypersomnia
 Sleep disordered breathing (SDB), including (non-exhaustive):
 Several types of sleep apnea
 Snoring
 Upper airway resistance syndrome
 Restless leg syndrome
 Periodic limb movement disorder
 Circadian rhythm sleep disorders
 Delayed sleep phase disorder
 Advanced sleep phase disorder
 Non-24-hour sleep–wake disorder
 Parasomnias – A category of sleep disorders that involve abnormal and unnatural movements, behaviors, emotions, perceptions, and dreams in connection with sleep.
 Bedwetting or sleep enuresis
 Bruxism (Tooth-grinding)
 Catathrenia – nocturnal groaning
 Exploding head syndrome – Waking up in the night hearing loud noises.
 Sleep terror (or Pavor nocturnus) – Characterized by a sudden arousal from deep sleep with a scream or cry, accompanied by some behavioral manifestations of intense fear.
 REM sleep behavior disorder
 Sleepwalking (or somnambulism)
 Sleep talking (or somniloquy)
 Sleep sex (or sexsomnia)
 Medical or psychiatric conditions that may produce sleep disorders
 22q11.2 deletion syndrome
 Alcoholism
 Mood disorders
 Depression
 Anxiety disorder
 Nightmare disorder
 Panic
 Dissociative identity disorder
 Psychosis (such as Schizophrenia)
 Sleeping sickness – a parasitic disease which can be transmitted by the Tsetse fly.

Causes 
A systematic review found that traumatic childhood experiences (such as family conflict or sexual trauma) significantly increases the risk for a number of sleep disorders in adulthood, including sleep apnea, narcolepsy, and insomnia.

In addition, an evidence-based synopsis suggests that idiopathic REM sleep behavior disorder (iRBD) may have a hereditary component. A total of 632 participants, half with iRBD and half without, completed self-report questionnaires. The results of the study suggest that people with iRBD are more likely to report having a first-degree relative with the same sleep disorder than people of the same age and sex that do not have the disorder. More research needs to be conducted to further understand the hereditary nature of sleep disorders.

A population susceptible to the development of sleep disorders includes people who have experienced a traumatic brain injury (TBI). Because many researchers have focused on this issue, a systematic review was conducted to synthesize their findings. The results indicate that individuals who experienced a TBI are most disproportionately at risk for developing narcolepsy, obstructive sleep apnea, excessive daytime sleepiness, and insomnia. The study's complete findings can be found in the table below:

Sleep disorders and Neurodegenerative Diseases 
Neurodegenerative diseases have often been associated with sleep disorders, mainly when they are characterized by abnormal accumulation of alpha-synuclein, such as multiple system atrophy (MSA), Parkinson's disease (PD) and Lewy body disease (LBD). For instance, people diagnosed with PD have often presented different kinds of sleep concerns, commonly in regard to insomnia (around 70% of the PD population), hypersomnia (more than 50% of the PD population), and REM sleep behavior disorder (RBD) - that may affect around 40% of the PD population and it is associated with increased motor symptoms. Furthermore, RBD has been highlighted as a strong precursor for future development of those neurodegenerative diseases over several years in prior, which seems to be a great opportunity for improving the treatments of the disease.

Sleep disturbances have been also observed in Alzheimer's disease (AD), affecting about 45% of its population. When based on caregiver reports, this percentage increases to about 70%. As well as in PD population, insomnia and hypersomnia are frequently recognized in AD patients, which have been associated with accumulation of beta-amyloid, circadian rhythm sleep disorders (CRSD) and melatonin alteration. Additionally, changes in sleep architecture are observed in AD. Although sleep architecture seems to naturally change with age, its development appears aggravated in AD patients. SWS potentially decreases (and is sometimes absent), spindles and the length of time spent in REM sleep are also reduced, while its latency increases. Poor sleep onset in AD has been associated with dream-related hallucination, increased restlessness, wandering and agitation that seem related to sundowning - a typical chronobiological phenomenon presented in the disease.

The neurodegenerative conditions are commonly related to structural brain impairment, which might disrupt the states of sleep and wakefulness, circadian rhythm, motor or non motor functioning. On the other hand, sleep disturbances are frequently related to worsening patient's cognitive functioning, emotional state and quality of life. Furthermore, these abnormal behavioral symptoms negatively contribute to overwhelming their relatives and caregivers. The limited research related to it and the increasing life expectancy calls for a deeper understanding of the relationship between sleep disorders and neurodegenerative disease.

Sleep disturbances and Alzheimer's Disease 
More than 70% of people with dementia are affected by Alzheimer's disease (AD). Despite this high number, our understanding of the underlying mechanisms for disease progression remains very limited. However, recent studies have highlighted a link between sleep disturbances and Alzheimer's disease.

Sleep changes with normal aging. Over time, a decrease in time sleeping and a decrease in the quantity of NREM sleep can be observed, specifically in NREM SWS (less than 10% of the SWS is maintained). Older people also are more prone to insomnia or sleep apnea.

In Alzheimer's disease, in addition to cognitive decline and memory impairment, there are also significant sleep disturbances with modified sleep architecture. The latter may consist in sleep fragmentation, reduced sleep duration, insomnia, increased daytime napping, decreased quantity of some sleep stages, and a growing resemblance between some sleep stages (N1 and N2). More than 65% of people with Alzheimer's disease have this type of sleep disturbance.

One factor that could explain this change in sleep architecture is a change in circadian rhythm, which regulates sleep. A disruption of the circadian rhythm would generate sleep disturbances. Some studies show that people with AD have a delayed circadian rhythm, whereas in normal aging, an advanced circadian rhythm is present.

In addition to these psychological symptoms, at a neurological level there are two main symptoms of Alzheimer's disease. The first is an accumulation of beta-amyloid waste forming aggregate "plaques". The second is an accumulation of tau protein.

It has been shown that the sleep-wake cycle acts on the beta-amyloid burden, which is a central component found in AD. As individuals awaken, the production of beta-amyloid protein will be more consistent than its production during sleep. This is explained by two phenomena. The first is that the metabolic activity will be higher during waking, thus resulting in greater secretion of beta-amyloid protein. The second is that oxidative stress will also increase, which leads to greater AB production.

On the other hand, it is during sleep that beta-amyloid residues are degraded to prevent plaque formation. The glymphatic system is responsible for this through the phenomenon of glymphatic clearance. Thus, during wakefulness, the AB burden is greater because the metabolic activity and oxidative stress are higher, and there is no protein degradation by the glymphatic clearance. During sleep, the burden is reduced as there is less metabolic activity and oxidative stress (in addition to the glymphatic clearance that occurs).

Glymphatic clearance occurs during the NREM SWS sleep. This sleep stage decreases in normal aging, resulting in less glymphatic clearance and increased AB burden that will form AB plaques. Therefore, sleep disturbances in individuals with AD will amplify this phenomenon.

The decrease in the quantity and quality of the NREM SWS, as well as the disturbances of sleep will therefore increase the AB plaques. This initially occurs in the hippocampus, which is a brain structure integral in long-term memory formation. Hippocampus cell death occurs, which contributes to diminished memory performance and cognitive decline found in AD.

Although the causal relationship is unclear, the development of AD correlates with the development of prominent sleep disorders. In the same way, sleep disorders exacerbate disease progression, forming a positive feedback relationship. As a result, sleep disturbances are no longer only a symptom of AD; the relationship between sleep disturbances and AD is bidirectional.

At the same time, it has been shown that memory consolidation in long-term memory (which depends on the hippocampus) occurs during NREM sleep. This indicates that a decrease in the NREM sleep will result in less consolidation, resulting in poorer memory performances in hippocampal-dependent long-term memory. This drop in performance is one of the central symptoms of AD.

Recent studies have also linked sleep disturbances, neurogenesis and AD. The subgranular zone and the subventricular zone continued to produce new neurons in adult brains. These new cells are then incorporated into neuronal circuits and the subragranular zone, which is found in the hippocampus. These new cells contribute to learning and memory, playing an essential role in hippocampal-dependent memory.

However, recent studies have shown that several factors can interrupt neurogenesis, including stress and prolonged sleep deprivation (more than one day). The sleep disturbances encountered in AD could therefore suppress neurogenesis—and thus impair hippocampal functions. This would contribute to diminished memory performances and the progression of AD, and the progression of AD would aggravate sleep disturbances.

Changes in sleep architecture found in patients with AD occur during the preclinical phase of AD. These changes could be used to detect those most at risk of developing AD. However, this is still only theoretical.

While the exact mechanisms and the causal relationship between sleep disturbances and AD remains unclear, these findings already provide a better understanding and offer possibilities to improve targeting of at-risk populations—and the implementation of treatments to curb the cognitive decline of AD patients.

Sleep disorder symptoms in psychiatric illnesses

Schizophrenia 
In individuals with psychiatric illnesses sleep disorders may include a variety of clinical symptoms, including but not limited to: excessive daytime sleepiness, difficulty falling asleep, difficulty staying asleep, nightmares, sleep talking, sleepwalking, and poor sleep quality. Sleep disturbances - insomnia, hypersomnia and delayed sleep-phase disorder - are quite prevalent in severe mental illnesses such as psychotic disorders. In those with schizophrenia, sleep disorders contribute to cognitive deficits in learning and memory. Sleep disturbances often occur before the onset of psychosis.

Sleep deprivation can also produce hallucinations, delusions and depression. A 2019 study investigated the three above-mentioned sleep disturbances in schizophrenia-spectrum (SCZ) and bipolar (BP) disorders in 617 SCZ individuals, 440 BP individuals, and 173 healthy controls (HC). Sleep disturbances were identified using the Inventory for Depressive Symptoms - clinician rated scale (IDS-C). Results suggested that at least one type of sleep disturbance was reported in 78% of the SCZ population, in 69% individuals with BD, and in 39% of healthy controls. The SCZ group reported the most number of sleep disturbances compared to the BD and HC groups; specifically, hypersomnia was more frequent among individuals with SCZ, and delayed sleep phase disorder was three times more common in the SCZ group compared to the BD group. Insomnias were the most frequently reported sleep disturbance across all three groups.

Bipolar disorder 
One of the main behavioral symptoms of bipolar disorder is abnormal sleep. Studies have suggested that 23-78% of individuals with bipolar disorders consistently report symptoms of excessive time spent sleeping, or hypersomnia. The pathogenesis of bipolar disorder, including the higher risk of suicidal ideation, could possibly be linked to circadian rhythm variability, and sleep disturbances are a good predictor of mood swings. The most common sleep-related symptom of bipolar disorder is insomnia, in addition to hypersomnia, nightmares, poor sleep quality, OSA, extreme daytime sleepiness, etc. Moreover, animal models have shown that sleep debt can induce episodes of bipolar mania in laboratory mice, but these models are still limited in their potential to explain bipolar disease in humans with all its multifaceted symptoms, including those related to sleep disturbances.

Major depressive disorder (MDD) 
Sleep disturbances (insomnia or hypersomnia) are not a necessary diagnostic criterion—but one of the most frequent symptoms of individuals with major depressive disorder (MDD). Among individuals with MDD, insomnia and hypersomnia have prevalence estimates of 88% and 27%, respectively, whereas individuals with insomnia have a threefold increased risk of developing MDD. Depressed mood and sleep efficiency strongly co-vary, and while sleep regulation problems may precede depressive episodes, such depressive episodes may also precipitate sleep deprivation. Fatigue, as well as sleep disturbances such as irregular and excessive sleepiness, are linked to symptoms of depression. Recent research has even pointed to sleep problems and fatigues as potential driving forces bridging MDD symptoms to those of co-occurring generalized anxiety disorder.

Treatment 

Treatments for sleep disorders generally can be grouped into four categories:
 Behavioral and psychotherapeutic treatment
 Rehabilitation and management
 Medication
 Other somatic treatment

None of these general approaches are sufficient for all patients with sleep disorders. Rather, the choice of a specific treatment depends on the patient's diagnosis, medical and psychiatric history, and preferences, as well as the expertise of the treating clinician. Often, behavioral/psychotherapeutic and pharmacological approaches may be compatible, and can effectively be combined to maximize therapeutic benefits.

Management of sleep disturbances that are secondary to mental, medical, or substance abuse disorders should focus on the underlying conditions. Medications and somatic treatments may provide the most rapid symptomatic relief from certain disorders, such as narcolepsy, which is best treated with prescription drugs such as modafinil. Others, such as chronic and primary insomnia, may be more amenable to behavioral interventions—with more durable results.

Chronic sleep disorders in childhood, which affect some 70% of children with developmental or psychological disorders, are under-reported and under-treated. Sleep-phase disruption is also common among adolescents, whose school schedules are often incompatible with their natural circadian rhythm. Effective treatment begins with careful diagnosis using sleep diaries and perhaps sleep studies. Modifications in sleep hygiene may resolve the problem, but medical treatment is often warranted.

Special equipment may be required for treatment of several disorders such as obstructive apnea, circadian rhythm disorders and bruxism. In severe cases, it may be necessary for individuals to accept living with the disorder, however well managed.

Some sleep disorders have been found to compromise glucose metabolism.

Allergy treatment 
Histamine plays a role in wakefulness in the brain. An allergic reaction over produces histamine, causing wakefulness and inhibiting sleep. Sleep problems are common in people with allergic rhinitis. A study from the N.I.H. found that sleep is dramatically impaired by allergic symptoms, and that the degree of impairment is related to the severity of those symptoms. Treatment of allergies has also been shown to help sleep apnea.

Acupuncture 
A review of the evidence in 2012 concluded that current research is not rigorous enough to make recommendations around the use of acupuncture for insomnia. The pooled results of two trials on acupuncture showed a moderate likelihood that there may be some improvement to sleep quality for individuals with insomnia. This form of treatment for sleep disorders is generally studied in adults, rather than children. Further research would be needed to study the effects of acupuncture on sleep disorders in children.

Hypnosis 
Research suggests that hypnosis may be helpful in alleviating some types and manifestations of sleep disorders in some patients. "Acute and chronic insomnia often respond to relaxation and hypnotherapy approaches, along with sleep hygiene instructions." Hypnotherapy has also helped with nightmares and sleep terrors. There are several reports of successful use of hypnotherapy for parasomnias specifically for head and body rocking, bedwetting and sleepwalking.

Hypnotherapy has been studied in the treatment of sleep disorders in both adults and children.

Music therapy 

Although more research should be done to increase the reliability of this method of treatment, research suggests that music therapy can improve sleep quality in acute and chronic sleep disorders. In one particular study, participants (18 years or older) who had experienced acute or chronic sleep disorders were put in a randomly controlled trial, and their sleep efficiency, in the form of overall time asleep, was observed. In order to assess sleep quality, researchers used subjective measures (i.e. questionnaires) and objective measures (i.e. polysomnography). The results of the study suggest that music therapy did improve sleep quality in subjects with acute or chronic sleep disorders, though only when tested subjectively. Although these results are not fully conclusive and more research should be conducted, it still provides evidence that music therapy can be an effective treatment for sleep disorders.

In another study specifically looking to help people with insomnia, similar results were seen. The participants that listened to music experienced better sleep quality than those who did not listen to music. Listening to slower pace music before bed can help decrease the heart rate, making it easier to transition into sleep. Studies have indicated that music helps induce a state of relaxation that shifts an individual's internal clock towards the sleep cycle. This is said to have an effect on children and adults with various cases of sleep disorders. Music is most effective before bed once the brain has been conditioned to it, helping to achieve sleep much faster.

Melatonin 
Research suggests that melatonin is useful in helping people fall asleep faster (decreased sleep latency), stay asleep longer, and experience improved sleep quality. To test this, a study was conducted that compared subjects who had taken melatonin to subjects with primary sleep disorders who had taken a placebo. Researchers assessed sleep onset latency, total minutes slept, and overall sleep quality in the melatonin and placebo groups to note the differences. In the end, researchers found that melatonin decreased sleep onset latency and increased total sleep time  but had an insignificant and inconclusive impact on the quality of sleep compared to the placebo group.

Sleep medicine 

Due to rapidly increasing knowledge and understanding of sleep in the 20th century, including the discovery of REM sleep in the 1950s and circadian rhythm disorders in the 70s and 80s, the medical importance of sleep was recognized. By the 1970s in the US, clinics and laboratories devoted to the study of sleep and sleep disorders had been founded, and a need for standards arose. The medical community began paying more attention to primary sleep disorders, such as sleep apnea, as well as the role and quality of sleep in other conditions.

Specialists in sleep medicine were originally and continue to be certified by the American Board of Sleep Medicine. Those passing the Sleep Medicine Specialty Exam received the designation "diplomate of the ABSM." Sleep medicine is now a recognized subspecialty within internal medicine, family medicine, pediatrics, otolaryngology, psychiatry and neurology in the United States. Certification in Sleep medicine shows that the specialist:

Competence in sleep medicine requires an understanding of a myriad of very diverse disorders. Many of which present with similar symptoms such as excessive daytime sleepiness, which, in the absence of volitional sleep deprivation, "is almost inevitably caused by an identifiable and treatable sleep disorder", such as sleep apnea, narcolepsy, idiopathic hypersomnia, Kleine–Levin syndrome, menstrual-related hypersomnia, idiopathic recurrent stupor, or circadian rhythm disturbances. Another common complaint is insomnia, a set of symptoms which can have a great many different causes, physical and mental. Management in the varying situations differs greatly and cannot be undertaken without a correct diagnosis.

Sleep dentistry (bruxism, snoring and sleep apnea), while not recognized as one of the nine dental specialties, qualifies for board-certification by the American Board of Dental Sleep Medicine (ABDSM). The qualified dentists collaborate with sleep physicians at accredited sleep centers, and can provide oral appliance therapy and upper airway surgery to treat or manage sleep-related breathing disorders. The resulting diplomate status is recognized by the American Academy of Sleep Medicine (AASM), and these dentists are organized in the Academy of Dental Sleep Medicine (USA).

Occupational therapy is an area of medicine that can also address a diagnosis of sleep disorder, as rest and sleep is listed in the Occupational Therapy Practice Framework (OTPF) as its own occupation of daily living.  Rest and sleep are described as restorative in order to support engagement in other occupational therapy occupations.  In the OTPF, the occupation of rest and sleep is broken down into rest, sleep preparation, and sleep participation. Occupational therapists have been shown to help improve restorative sleep through the use of assistive devices/equipment, cognitive behavioral therapy for Insomnia, therapeutic activities, and/or lifestyle interventions.

In the UK, knowledge of sleep medicine and possibilities for diagnosis and treatment seem to lag. The Imperial College Healthcare shows attention to obstructive sleep apnea syndrome (OSA) and very few other sleep disorders. Some NHS trusts have specialist clinics for respiratory and/or neurological sleep medicine.

Epidemiology

Children and young adults 
According to one meta-analysis of sleep disorders in children, confusional arousals and sleepwalking are the two most common sleep disorders among children. An estimated 17.3% of kids between 3 and 13 years old experience confusional arousals. About 17% of children sleepwalk, with the disorder being more common among boys than girls, the peak ages of sleepwalking are from 8 to 12 years old.

A different systematic review offers a high range of prevalence rates of sleep bruxism for children. Parasomnias like sleepwalking and talking typically occur during the first part of an individual's sleep cycle, the first slow wave of sleep  During the first slow wave of sleep period of the sleep cycle the mind and body slow down causing one to feel drowsy and relaxed. At this stage it is the easiest to wake up, therefore many children do not remember what happened during this time.

Nightmares are also considered a parasomnia among children, who typically remember what took place during the nightmare. However, nightmares only occur during the last stage of sleep - Rapid Eye Movement (REM) sleep. REM is the deepest stage of sleep, it is named for the host of neurological and physiological responses an individual can display during this period of the sleep cycle which are similar to being awake.

Between 15.29% and 38.6% of preschoolers grind their teeth at least one night a week. All but one of the included studies reports decreasing bruxist prevalence as age increased, as well as a higher prevalence among boys than girls.

Another systematic review noted 7-16% of young adults have delayed sleep phase disorder. This disorder reaches peak prevalence when people are in their 20s.  Between 20 and 26% of adolescents report a sleep onset latency of greater than 30 minutes. Also, 7-36% have difficulty initiating sleep.  Asian teens tend to have a higher prevalence of all of these adverse sleep outcomes—than their North American and European counterparts.

By adulthood, parasomnias can normally be resolved due to a person's growth; however, 4% of people have recurring symptoms.

Effects of Untreated Sleep Disorders 
Children and young adults who do not get enough sleep due to sleep disorders also have many other health problems such as obesity and physical problems where it could interfere with everyday life. It is recommended that children and young adults stick to the hours of sleep recommended by the CDC, as it helps increase mental health, physical health, and more.

Insomnia 
Insomnia is a prevalent form of sleep deprivation. Individuals with insomnia may have problems falling asleep, staying asleep, or a combination of both resulting in hyposomnia - i.e. insufficient quantity and poor quality of sleep.

Combining results from 17 studies on insomnia in China, a pooled prevalence of 15.0% is reported for the country.  This result is consistent among other East Asian countries; however, this is considerably lower than a series of Western countries (50.5% in Poland, 37.2% in France and Italy, 27.1% in USA). Men and women residing in China experience insomnia at similar rates.

A separate meta-analysis focusing on this sleeping disorder in the elderly mentions that those with more than one physical or psychiatric malady experience it at a 60% higher rate than those with one condition or less. It also notes a higher prevalence of insomnia in women over the age of 50 than their male counterparts.

A study that was resulted from a collaboration between Massachusetts General Hospital and Merck describes the development of an algorithm to identify patients with sleep disorders using electronic medical records. The algorithm that incorporated a combination of structured and unstructured variables identified more than 36,000 individuals with physician-documented insomnia.

Insomnia can start off at the basic level but about 40% of people who struggle with insomnia have worse symptoms. There are treatments that can help with insomnia and that includes medication, planning out a sleep schedule, limiting oneself from caffeine intake, and cognitive behavioral therapy.

Obstructive sleep apnea 
Obstructive sleep apnea (OSA) affects around 4% of men and 2% of women in the United States. In general, this disorder is more prevalent among men. However, this difference tends to diminish with age. Women experience the highest risk for OSA during pregnancy, and tend to report experiencing depression and insomnia in conjunction with obstructive sleep apnea.

In a meta-analysis of the various Asian countries, India and China present the highest prevalence of the disorder. Specifically, about 13.7% of the Indian population and 7% of Hong Kong's population is estimated to have OSA. The two groups in the study experience daytime OSA symptoms such as difficulties concentrating, mood swings, or high blood pressure, at similar rates (prevalence of 3.5% and 3.57%, respectively).

Sleep paralysis 
A systematic review states 7.6% of the general population experiences sleep paralysis at least once in their lifetime. Its prevalence among men is 15.9%, while 18.9% of women experience it.

When considering specific populations, 28.3% of students and 31.9% of psychiatric patients have experienced this phenomenon at least once in their lifetime. Of those psychiatric patients, 34.6% have panic disorder. Sleep paralysis in students is slightly more prevalent for those of Asian descent (39.9%) than other ethnicities (Hispanic: 34.5%, African descent: 31.4%, Caucasian 30.8%).

Restless leg syndrome 
According to one meta-analysis, the average prevalence rate for North America and Western Europe is estimated to be 14.5±8.0%. Specifically in the United States, the prevalence of restless leg syndrome is estimated to be between 5% and 15.7% when using strict diagnostic criteria. RLS is over 35% more prevalent in American women than their male counterparts.

See also

References

External links 

 
 Sleep Problems – information leaflet from mental health charity The Royal College of Psychiatrists
 WebMD Sleep Disorders Health Center